The Lure of Youth is a 1921 American silent romance film, directed by Phil Rosen. It stars Cleo Madison, William Conklin, and Gareth Hughes, and was released on January 10, 1921.

Cast list
 Cleo Madison as Florentine Fair
 William Conklin as Morton Mortimer
 Gareth Hughes as Roger Dent
 Lydia Knott as Ma Dent
 William Courtwright as Pa Dent
 Helen Weer as Marjorie Farnol

References

External links 
 
 
 

Films directed by Phil Rosen
Metro Pictures films
1920s romance films
American silent feature films
American romance films
American black-and-white films
1920s American films